The S4 ribosomal protein leader is  a  ribosomal protein leader involved in ribosome biogenesis. It is used as an autoregulatory mechanism to control the concentration of the ribosomal protein S4. Two examples of such leaders that use different conserved structures, in Bacillota and Gammaproteobacteria, have been experimentally confirmed.
Four additional S4 ribosomal protein leaders, each with distinct structures, were predicted in various bacteria phyla. In Bacteroidia or Bacillota, the structure is located in the 5′ untranslated regions of mRNAs encoding ribosomal proteins S4 (rpsD), RNA polymerase alpha subunit (rpoA) and L17 (rplQ).
In Clostridia (whose S4 ribosomal protein leader differs from that of other Bacillota) and  Gammaproteobacteria, the ribosomal proteins S13 (rpsM) and S11 (rpsK) were also part of the mRNA encoding region.

See also 
Ribosomal protein leader

References

External links 
 

Ribosomal protein leader